Patrick Stephen Madden (born 4 March 1990) is an Irish professional footballer who plays as a striker for  club Stockport County.

Club career

Bohemians
Madden signed league forms with Bohemians on 8 July 2008, and scored several times for the Bohemians "A" Team on their path to the Grand Final of the A League in that year. He made his Bohemians first team debut as a substitute in their 2–0 win over Cobh Ramblers on 8 November 2008.

Prior to the start of the 2009 season, Madden joined Shelbourne on loan on 10 February 2009. Bohemians manager Pat Fenlon sent the young striker out on loan hoping for Madden to gain first team experience. Madden made an immediate impression for Shelbourne by scoring in his first competitive appearance for Shels in their opening First Division match against Wexford Youths at Tolka Park on 6 March 2009. He also scored against his own employers for Shelbourne during an EA Sports Cup 2nd round tie at Dalymount Park on 4 May 2009. Madden's loan spell at Shelbourne concluded on 29 June 2009 and he returned to Bohemians. During his loan spell at Shelbourne, Madden made 16 league and cup appearances and scored 8 goals.

On 29 September 2009, Madden scored his first goal for Bohs in a 1–0 victory over Derry City in the Brandywell which led to Bohs returning to the top of the league.

In the 2010 season, Madden scored 9 goals in 5 matches, and he was voted the Soccer Writers Association of Ireland Player of the Month for June.

Carlisle United
Madden signed for English League One side Carlisle United on 31 January 2011, for an undisclosed fee signing a two-and-a-half-year contract with the Cumbrian club.

On 4 October 2012, Madden joined League One club Yeovil Town on an initial one-month loan deal with a view to extend to gain some much needed pitch time after not featuring in Carlisle's starting league squad this season. He had scored 1 goal in 3 substitute appearances for the Cumbrians this campaign. On 6 October 2012, he made his debut for Yeovil and scored a two goals in a 3–1 home victory against Colchester United. After going on a run of five goals in five games, he extended his loan until 2013. On 1 January 2013, Madden scored a brace in the final match of his loan spell against Leyton Orient ending with nine goals from sixteen games for Yeovil. Following the game it was announced Madden had signed permanently for Yeovil Town for an undisclosed fee on a two-and-a-half-year deal. Madden then went on to score 4 goals in his first two games as a permanent Yeovil Town player in the month of January. By mid February he was already League One top scorer, with 18 goals, despite only starting playing in October. In an interview with the BBC after this run of form he was described by his manager Gary Johnson as "the bargain of the season". Madden's contribution of 6 goals to Yeovil's perfect January of 3 out of 3 wins didn't go unrecognised as he won the League One Player of the Month award. Madden scored in the 2013 League One play-off final as Yeovil beat Brentford 2–1 to earn promotion to the Championship for the first time in the club's history. Madden ended the season with the League One golden boot with 23 goals (1 for Carlisle), plus his 2013 League One play-off final goal to make it 24 in all competitions. On 26 November 2013, with Madden having failed to score since Yeovil's promotion to the Championship, he was placed on the transfer list by the club.

Scunthorpe United
On 10 January 2014, Madden signed for Football League Two side Scunthorpe United for an undisclosed fee, believed to be £300,000, signing a -year contract. Madden's first game for Scunthorpe came on 11 January 2014 in a 0–2 away win over Mansfield Town. He scored his first goal for the club in a 5–1 win over Portsmouth on 22 February 2014.

Madden helped the club gain promotion to League One at the end of the 2013–14 season, scoring 5 goals in the process. For the following two seasons, Madden was the club's most prolific goalscorer, netting 16 goals in all competitions during 2014–15, and 23 goals in all competitions during 2015–16.

Madden suffered a significant downturn of form during Scunthorpe's play-off push in the 2016–17 season, despite featuring in the majority of the Iron's games. This downturn in form continued into the next season, with Madden scoring only 2 league goals during the very early stages of the 2017–18 season. Madden failed to score in any of his last 16 league appearances for the Iron.

Despite his downturn in form, Madden scored 60 goals across all competitions during his time with the Iron, placing him as the club's 10th most prolific goalscorer of all time.

Fleetwood Town
On 2 January 2018, Madden signed for fellow League One side Fleetwood Town for an undisclosed fee, believed to be £150,000, signing a -year contract.

He scored his 100th goal in English football in Fleetwood Town's FA Cup tie against Guiseley on 3 December 2018.

In May 2019 he signed a new three-year contract with the club.

During the 2020–21 season, Madden was sidelined for multiple matches after testing positive for COVID-19. At the time of Madden's departure from Fleetwood Town in March 2021, he was the club's all-time top scorer in the EFL with 43 goals. In all competitions, Madden scored 53 goals in 149 appearances for Fleetwood after joining the club from Scunthorpe United in January 2018.

Stockport County
On 15 March 2021, Madden signed for National League side Stockport County for an undisclosed fee, signing a three year deal. Madden was awarded the National League Player of the Month award for March 2022 after scoring four goals and assisting three as his side won all five of their league matches across the month as his side moved eleven points clear at the top of the table. Madden scored the first goal on the final day of the season as Stockport defeated FC Halifax Town 2–0, securing the league title.

Following a slow start to the season for both played and club, Madden was awarded the EFL League Two Player of the Month award for October 2022 having contributed to a goal in all six of Stockport's matches.

International career
Madden has represented the Republic of Ireland at U18 and U19 level and made his Republic of Ireland under-21 debut against Armenia in November 2009. In August 2013, Madden was called up for the first time to Republic of Ireland senior team to play Wales in a friendly. Madden made his debut coming on in the 69th minute.

Career statistics

Honours
Bohemians
League of Ireland Premier Division: 2009
Setanta Sports Cup: 2009–10

Carlisle United
Football League Trophy: 2010–11

Yeovil Town
Football League One play-offs: 2013

Stockport County
National League: 2021–22

Individual
PFA Team of the Year: 2012–13 League One
League of Ireland Player of the Month: June 2010
Football League One Player of the Month: January 2013
Football League One Golden Boot: 2012–13
National League Player of the Month: March 2022
Scunthorpe United Player of the Season: 2014–15
Stockport County Player of the Season: 2021–22
EFL League Two Player of the Month: October 2022

References

External links

Ireland profile at Soccerscene

1990 births
Living people
Association footballers from County Dublin
Republic of Ireland association footballers
Association football forwards
Bohemian F.C. players
Shelbourne F.C. players
Carlisle United F.C. players
Yeovil Town F.C. players
Scunthorpe United F.C. players
Fleetwood Town F.C. players
Stockport County F.C. players
League of Ireland players
English Football League players
National League (English football) players
A Championship players
Republic of Ireland international footballers
Republic of Ireland under-23 international footballers
Republic of Ireland under-21 international footballers
Republic of Ireland youth international footballers
League of Ireland XI players